Ryan J. Hilinski (born October 24, 2000) is an American football quarterback for the Northwestern Wildcats. He previously played for the South Carolina Gamecocks, where he started 11 games in 2019.

Early years
Hilinski attended the Lutheran High School of Orange County (commonly known as Orange Lutheran High School). As a senior, he played in 11 games and threw for 2,771 yards and 29 touchdowns. While in high school, he participated in the 2018 All-American Bowl.

Hilinski committed to South Carolina after receiving offers from 30 teams, including Stanford, USC, LSU, and Ohio State.

College career

South Carolina

2019
Hilinski was named backup quarterback prior to the start of the 2019 season. His first game appearance came during the 2019 Belk Kickoff Game against North Carolina after then starting quarterback Jake Bentley was injured in the game. Hilinski was named starting quarterback later that day. He made his first starting appearance in the second game of the season, a 72–10 win over Charleston Southern. With Hilinski starting, the Gamecocks would set a school record 775 yards of offense, as well as a school record 493 rushing yards. Next week, Hilinski would start in a home game against the Alabama Crimson Tide, a 47–23 loss, where he would complete more passes against Nick Saban's Crimson Tide than any other freshman quarterback.

Hilinski started 11 games his freshman year, completing 58.1 percent of his passes.  He finished with 11 touchdowns and 5 interceptions.

2020
In September 2020, Hilinski was named the backup quarterback behind Collin Hill.  He has appeared in 2 games. On December 30, 2020, Hilinski entered the transfer portal.

Northwestern

2021 
On January 19, 2021, Hilinski announced that he had transferred to Northwestern.

Statistics

Personal life 
Hilinski was born to Mark and Kym Hilinski as the youngest of three children in the family. Ryan's oldest brother, Kelly, played as a quarterback for Notre Dame High School, Columbia University, Riverside City College and Weber State University. His second older brother, Tyler, who was also a quarterback at Washington State, died by suicide following his junior season.

References

External links
 South Carolina bio

2000 births
Living people
American football quarterbacks
Northwestern Wildcats football players
Players of American football from California
South Carolina Gamecocks football players
Sportspeople from Orange, California